A cash flow hedge is  a hedge of the exposure to the variability of cash flow that
 is attributable to a particular risk associated with a recognized asset or liability. Such as all or some future interest payments on variable rate debt or a highly probable forecast transaction and
 could affect profit or loss (IAS 39, §86b)

This is mostly an accountant's definition.

See also
 Hedge accounting
 Accumulated other comprehensive income
 Statement of changes in equity

Financial risk
Cash flow
Derivatives (finance)